Malambo, the Good Man is a 2018 Argentine black-and-white drama film directed by Santiago Loza. It was screened in the Panorama section at the 68th Berlin International Film Festival.

By the tradition of the Festival, winners can no longer compete. The film is a semi-documentary fictional narration about the experience of competitive malambo dancers.

References

External links
 

2018 films
2018 drama films
Argentine black-and-white films
Argentine drama films
2010s Spanish-language films
Dance in film
2010s Argentine films